USS Wakonda (YTB-528) was a large yard tug proposed for the United States Navy that was not built.

Wakonda was a Hisada-class large yard tug slated to be built at Jacksonville, Florida, by the Gibbs Gas Engine Company, but the contract for her construction was cancelled in October 1945.
The ship was never built.

References

Tugs of the United States Navy
Cancelled ships of the United States Navy